A folk hero or national hero is a type of hero – real, fictional or mythological – with their name, personality and deeds embedded in the popular consciousness of a people, mentioned frequently in folk songs, folk tales and other folklore; and with modern trope status in literature, art and films.

Overview 
Although some folk heroes are historical public figures, many are not. The lives of folk heroes are generally fictional, their characteristics and deeds often exaggerated to mythic proportions.

The folk hero often begins life as a normal person, but is transformed into someone extraordinary by significant life events, often in response to social injustice, and sometimes in response to natural disasters.

One major category of folk hero is the defender of the common people against the oppression or corruption of the established power structure.  Members of this category of folk hero often, but not necessarily, live outside the law in some way.

See also

 List of folk heroes
 Culture hero

References

Bibliography
 Seal, Graham. Encyclopedia of Folk Heroes. ABC-CLIO, 2001.

Folklore characters
Heroes
Mythological archetypes